Darbhanga Fort is also called Ram Bagh Fort, because it is situated in Rambagh Palace inside the fort. Rambagh campus is surrounded by walls and spreads in about 85 acres of land.

But when the construction of the fort was completed on three sides and the wall of the western part was being constructed that India got independence from the British rule. In India, the new government came to power and stopped the princely state and zamindari system. As a result, the semi-constructed wall was built up to the same place and the fort was stopped.

History
Prior to the formation of the fort, this area was a part of the village named Islampur, which was under the control of Nawab Aliwardi Khan of Murshidabad State. Afterwards, it came under the control of the progeny of Maharaja of Darbhanga, Shri Kameshwar Singh.

After this, in 1930, when Maharaja Kameshwar Singh decided to build a fort here like other forts of India, the Muslim majority population here settled in places like Shivdhara, Alinagar, Laheriyasarai, Chakodohara with compensation of land.

Architecture
In the memory of this historic moment, the construction of Darbhanga Raj Fort was started in 1934. A company of Calcutta was contracted to build the fort.

The walls of the fort are constructed of red bricks. The wall of the fort was quite thick. The watchtower and guard house were built in the upper part of the wall.

The main gate of the fort which is called the Sinhala, but rare scenes from architecture have been scattered. The ditch was constructed around the wall within the fort. It was filled with equal water in the trench. It was done for the protection of the fort and, in fact, the Raj family.

See also
 Zamindars of Bihar
 Rohtasgarh Fort
 Munger Fort
 Anand Bagh Palace
 Nargona Palace

References

External links
</ref>

Forts in Bihar
Tourist attractions in Darbhanga district